Jeff Anderson is an American musician originally from Marietta, Georgia. His debut album, Seamless, was released on March 15, 2005. Anderson released his full-length LP titled In the Shadow in July 2012.

Discography

Albums
 Seamless, 2005 [Gotee]
 In the Shadow, 2012 [United Republic Records]

Singles
"Open My Eyes"

References

External links
 

Gotee Records artists
1978 births
American performers of Christian music
Living people
Musicians from Marietta, Georgia
21st-century American male singers
21st-century American singers
American male singer-songwriters
Singer-songwriters from Georgia (U.S. state)